Michel Reimon (born 11 July  1971) is an Austrian politician who has been serving as a member of the National Council since 2019. He is a member of The Greens-The Green Alternative, part of the  European Green Party.

Political career
Reimon served as a Member of the European Parliament (MEP) from 2014 until 2019. In parliament, he was a member of the Committee on Industry, Research and Energy (ITRE) and the delegation for relations with the Mashreq countries.

In addition to his committee assignments, Reimon has been a member of the Austrian delegation to the Parliamentary Assembly of the Council of Europe (PACE) since 2020, where he serves on the Committee on Legal Affairs and Human Rights.

References

Living people
1971 births
MEPs for Austria 2014–2019
The Greens – The Green Alternative MEPs